North Korean may refer to:
 Something of, from, or related to the country of North Korea
 A Korean from North Korea, or of North Korean descent. For information about the North Korean people, see Demographics of North Korea and Culture of North Korea
 The Korean language as spoken in North Korea, including a number of Korean dialects

See also 
 

Language and nationality disambiguation pages